Norman Marshall Henderson (7 March 1901 – 7 January 1968) was an Australian rules footballer who played with Melbourne in the Victorian Football League (VFL).

Family
The son of George Henry Henderson (1873-1923), and Sarah Ann Henderson (1872-1929), née Marshall, Norman Marshall Henderson was born at Carlton North, Victoria on 7 March 1901.

He married Alma Edith Burrows (1906-1960) in 1936.

Football

Melbourne (VFL)
He played in two First XVIII matches for Melbourne in 1920.

Hawthorn (VFA)
On 3 May 1922, he was cleared from Melbourne to the Hawthorn football club, then competing in the VFA.

Death
He died on 7 January 1968.

Notes

References

External links 
 
 
 Norm Henderson, at Demonwiki.
 Norm Henderson, at The VFA Project.

1901 births
Australian rules footballers from Victoria (Australia)
Melbourne Football Club players
Hawthorn Football Club (VFA) players
1968 deaths